Ader is a Hebrew origin surname. Notable people with the surname include:

 Alfred Ader
 Bas Jan Ader (1942–1975), Dutch conceptual artist
 Clément Ader (1841–1925), French flight pioneer
 Robert Ader
 Tammy Ader
 Walt Ader (1913–1982), American racecar driver
 János Áder (born 1959), President of Hungary

See also
Adèr
Erwin Aders

References